Selenginsk (Selengyn, Selenge) is an urban locality (an urban-type settlement) in Kabansky District of the Republic of Buryatia, Russia, located at the head of the Selenga River delta about  from Lake Baikal and about  northwest of Ulan-Ude, the capital of the republic. As of the 2010 Census, its population was 14,546.

History
It was established in 1961 as a Komsomol project around a paper mill. In post-Soviet times the paper mill was seen as a major source of pollution.

Administrative and municipal status
Within the framework of administrative divisions, the urban-type settlement (inhabited locality) of Selenginsk is incorporated within Kabansky District as Selenginsk Urban-Type Settlement (an administrative division of the district). As a municipal division, Selenginsk Urban-Type Settlement is incorporated within Kabansky Municipal District as Selenginskoye Urban Settlement.

Transportation
Selenginsk stands on the Trans-Siberian Railway and the Trans-Siberian Highway.

References

Notes

Sources

Urban-type settlements in Buryatia
Populated places in Kabansky District
Monotowns in Russia
Populated places established in 1961